Antius may refer to a number of people or things:

Antiu, a people of ancient Egypt
Antia (gens), a family of ancient Romans with the name Antius